Atom is an action game published by Tandy in 1983 for the TRS-80 Color Computer. The game educates the player about the elements of the periodic table from hydrogen through xenon.

Gameplay
The player takes command of a ship (presumably a graviton) on an x axis plane to collect and shoot electrons at a spinning atom to obtain a new atom. For example, if the player has one electron circling, shooting another electron in place will make a hydrogen atom. If the electron misses the target and hits the nucleus, the atom becomes unstable and blows apart, sending electrons flying around the game screen, and the ship needs to find safety behind barriers located in three of the four corners of the arena.

Atom is a timed game with a countdown timer in the upper left corner of the arena timed in nanoseconds (actually tenths). Once the timer reaches zero, the atom destabilizes and explodes.

References

1983 video games
TRS-80 Color Computer games
TRS-80 Color Computer-only games
Science educational video games
Video games developed in the United States